Maitre or Maître is a French-language title, associated with lawyers. It is also a surname, equivalent to the English "Master"

Notable people with the surname include:

Jean-Philippe Maitre (1949–2006), Swiss politician
Romain Maitre (born 1988), French motorcycle racer

See also

 
 
 Maistre (surname)
 Le Maitre (surname)

French-language surnames